1994–95 was the 33rd season in the history of SD Compostela, and their first in La Liga.

Season summary

Compostela completed their rise from the Tercera División under Fernando Castro Santos by winning promotion via the Segunda División playoffs in 1994. They drew 1–1 on aggregate with Rayo Vallecano, before winning a tiebreak match in Oviedo. The first La Liga season in their history was a moderate success, as they ended in 16th place, avoiding the relegation playoffs thanks to their superior head-to-head record against Albacete Balompié. Compostela were eliminated in the fourth round of the Copa del Rey by Segunda División side Lleida.

Castro Santos left his post at the end of the season to take over at fellow Galician club Celta Vigo, and was replaced by Lugo manager Fernando Vázquez.

Squad

Left club during season

Squad stats
Last updated on 12 March 2021.

|-
|colspan="14"|Players who have left the club after the start of the season:

|}

La Liga

See also
SD Compostela
1994–95 La Liga
1994–95 Copa del Rey

References

SD Compostela seasons
Compostela